The Singapore United Party (abbreviation: SUP) is an opposition political party in Singapore founded on 24 December 2020.

Party founding 
The party was formed out of former members of the Reform Party in the aftermath of the 2020 Singaporean general election. Its secretary-general is Andy Zhu, formerly chairman of the Reform Party.

Following the 2020 general election, the Reform Party announced that its chairman Andy Zhu and treasurer Noraini Yunus had stepped down from the central executive committee. Reform Party secretary-general Kenneth Jeyaretnam alleged that Zhu had modified the party's payment policy without prior approval and the pair had been voted out unanimously. Zhu declined the allegations and claimed that he had been ousted via "undemocratic” means, while also contesting Jeyaretnam's statement that the vote had been unanimous.

On 24 December 2020, the Singapore United Party was registered at the Registry of Societies, with Zhu becoming the party's secretary-general. Zhu sought to emphasise that the party was not a breakaway faction of his former party; analysts have noted that the party at its founding consists of a large proportion of former members of the Reform Party. As the party is still new to the electoral landscape of Singapore, it lacks a distinct manifesto or ideology, though it has pledged to work on "bread-and-butter issues" and women's rights.

Leadership
The following members are part of the Singapore United Party's central executive committee.

References

Political parties established in 2020
2020 establishments in Singapore
Political parties in Singapore